Pterotragula leucoloma is a species of beetle in the family Cerambycidae, and the only species in the genus Pterotragula. It was described by Laporte de Castelnau in 1840.

References

Pteropliini
Beetles described in 1840